Pompholyx is a genus of rotifers belonging to the family Testudinellidae.

The species of this genus are found in Europe and Australia.

Species:

Pompholyx complanata 
Pompholyx sulcata 
Pompholyx triloba

References

Flosculariaceae